This article shows the rosters of all participating teams at the Women's U20 World Championship 2015 in Puerto Rico.

Pool A

The following is the Russian roster in the 2015 FIVB Volleyball Women's U20 World Championship.

Head Coach: Petr Kobrin

The following is the Bulgarian roster in the 2015 FIVB Volleyball Women's U20 World Championship.

Head Coach: Ivan Petkov

The following is the Cuban roster in the 2015 FIVB Volleyball Women's U20 World Championship.

Head Coach: Wilfredo Robinson Pupo

The following is the Puerto Rican roster in the 2015 FIVB Volleyball Women's U20 World Championship.

Head Coach: Xiomara Molero

Pool B

The following is the Peruvian roster in the 2015 FIVB Volleyball Women's U20 World Championship.

Head Coach: Natalia Malaga

The following is the Serbian roster in the 2015 FIVB Volleyball Women's U20 World Championship.

Head Coach: Marijana Boričić

The following is the Chinese roster in the 2015 FIVB Volleyball Women's U20 World Championship.

Head Coach: Chen Youquan

The following is the Mexican roster in the 2015 FIVB Volleyball Women's U20 World Championship.

Head Coach: Luis Leon

Pool C

The following is the Italian roster in the 2015 FIVB Volleyball Women's U20 World Championship.

Head Coach: Luca Cristofani

The following is the Japanese roster in the 2015 FIVB Volleyball Women's U20 World Championship.

Head Coach: Kiyoshi Abo

The following is the Taiwanese roster in the 2015 FIVB Volleyball Women's U20 World Championship.

Head Coach: Kuang Chin-Tu

The following is the Egyptian roster in the 2015 FIVB Volleyball Women's U20 World Championship.

Head Coach: Ahmed Fathi

Pool D

The following is the Dominican roster in the 2015 FIVB Volleyball Women's U20 World Championship.

Head Coach: Wagner Pacheco

The following is the Brazilian roster in the 2015 FIVB Volleyball Women's U20 World Championship.

Head Coach: Mauricio Thomas

The following is the Turkish roster in the 2015 FIVB Volleyball Women's U20 World Championship.

Head Coach: Hasan Celik

The following is the Czechs roster in the 2015 FIVB Volleyball Women's U20 World Championship.

Head Coach: Ales Novak

See also
2015 FIVB Volleyball Men's U21 World Championship squads

References

External links
Official website

FIVB Volleyball Women's U20 World Championship
FIVB Women's Junior World Championship
FIVB Girls Youth World Championship
International volleyball competitions hosted by Puerto Rico
2015 in youth sport